

Winners by club

List of Winners

References 

Basketball in Egypt